23 Orionis is a double star located around  away from the Sun in the equatorial constellation of Orion. It is visible to the naked eye as a dim, blue-white-hued point of light with a combined apparent visual magnitude of 4.99. The pair are moving away from the Earth with a heliocentric radial velocity of +18 km/s, and they are members of the Orion OB1 association, subgroup 1a.

As of 2018, they had an angular separation of  along a position angle of 30°. The brighter member, component A, is a B-type main-sequence star with a stellar classification of B1V. The secondary, component B, is of class B3V. Both stars are spinning rapidly.

References

B-type main-sequence stars
Double stars
Orion (constellation)
Orionis, m
BD+03 0871
Orionis, 23
035148/9
025142/5
1770